Utarom Airport or Kaimana Airport  is an airport serving Kaimana, located in the province of West Papua in Indonesia. Due to increasing passengers, the airport was heavily modernized. The airport development is done in several stages, which begin in 2012, followed in 2014, and was completed at the end of 2015. Currently, Utarom Airport has a modern passenger terminal design like that of Wamena Airport. Airport capacity also increased to be able to accommodate 102 passengers during peak hours. The passenger terminal is made more comfortable in order to improve service to passengers In total, the construction of a passenger terminal covering an area of 1,800 square meters costs around Rp 75.5 billion. The development of the airport was completed at the end of 2015 and was inaugurated by President Joko Widodo on 30 December 2016.

Kaimana Airport which is a third class airport now has a runway length of 2,000 m x 30 cm, two taxiways, an apron area of 170 m x 60 m, and is able to accommodate planes such as the ATR 72-500. For the improvement of aviation safety, the airport is also equipped with new navigation equipment such as non-directional beacon (NDB), Doppler VHF omnidirectional range (DVOR), precision approach path indicator (PAPI), and the airfield lighting system (AFL).

Facilities

Airlines and destinations

Accidents and incidents
On May 7, 2011, the Merpati Nusantara Airlines Flight 8968, an Xian MA60 aircraft operating the flight crashed off the coast of West Papua on approach to Kaimana Airport in heavy rain. There were 21 passengers and 4 crew on board the aircraft; all were killed.

References

External links
Utarom Airport - Indonesia Airport Global Website
WW2 hangars in Utarom Airport, Kaimana
 

Airports in West Papua (province)